The Motorola i760 is a mobile telephone with push-to-talk capability, Java apps, GPS navigation, speakerphone, voice dialing and voice record. It can hold up to 600 phone book entries.

See also
List of Motorola products

References

I760